Kanyadanam  is an Indian Malayalam-language daily soap opera directed by Manu V. Nair. The show premiered on 23 August 2021 on Surya TV. It stars veteran Devan along with newcomers Anna Dona, Aiswarya Suresh, Aswathy Pillai, Silpa Sivadas and Soufiya Zakhir in lead roles. It aires everyday on Surya TV and on-demand through Sun NXT. The series is a reboot version of the Tamil series Metti Oli which was broadcast in 2002 and an official remake of Bengali serial Kanyadaan.

Premise
The show depicts the life of a doting father, Anandan and his five daughters.

Plot
The story is about Anandan Mash, and his five daughters, who face various challenges in life.

Anandan is a retired school teacher. He has five daughters, Ambili, Anupama (Anu), Chilanka (Cheeru), Daya and Manjadi. The girls' mother had passed away. Anandan is a respected man in the village and his daughters love him. Proposals start coming in for Ambili and Anu. A prospective groom for Ambili comes to meet her. He is Indran. Indran has a younger brother Sathyan and a younger sister Sona. All three of them were raised by a single-mother Susheela. Indran is the dearest to Susheela and he would do anything for her happiness. They reveal a shock that the eldest child from two families shouldn't marry and that they want Anu as their daughter-in-law. Anandan agrees to Indran - Anu wedding while Ambili's wedding is fixed with Raghu. The two couples marry.

Indran's house is a small rented house in the city. Susheela's true nature starts to be revealed and soon she starts to torture Anu. Indran though loving towards her doesn't speak against his mother nor let anyone else. Sathyan is the only one in the house who truly cares for Anu's well-being. He sets up an astrologer who tricks Indran and Susheela that if the mother-son duo stay together, Susheela's life would be at stake. Fearing this, Indran moves to a compound house with Anu, with Susheela visiting him regularly. Cheeru and Sathyan, who have been meeting regularly, fall in love.

Daya is the spoilt brat among the girls and is arrogant. She gets acquainted with a man called Nandu. Nandu is a married man but hides the fact from Daya to cheat on her for his own pleasures. Despite warnings from Cheeru, Daya spends time with Nandu and in turn of events, she marries him and loses her virginity. Very soon, she learns about his true colours. Daya relocates and stays with Anu in her compound. Sathyan's love for Cheeru is revealed to Indran and Anu, and they are happy. But things don't turn out well as Susheela opposes the idea. Cheeru's wedding with Vinayan and both families agree. Cheeru tries to forget Sathyan and starts to convince herself.

Sabarinath alias Sabari is a man who works in the railways. He meets Daya and immediately falls in love with her, without knowing her actual name. When Sathyan calls for Sona, Daya comes out instead and Sabari mistakes her to be Sathyan's sister, Sona. Fallen in love, he brings his family to see 'Sona' but his family doesn't like her. Realizing it's the wrong girl, Sabari creates much confusion, angering Susheela. But finally, his marriage is fixed with Daya.

Cheeru and Vinayan and Daya and Sabari gets married.

Cast

Lead

Recurring

Guest

Soundtrack

Adaptations

Awards

References

External links
 Official website 

Indian drama television series
Indian television soap operas
Indian television series
Malayalam-language television shows
2021 Indian television series debuts
Surya TV original programming
Malayalam-language television series based on Tamil-language television series